Charmus of Kolyttus ( mid-6th century BCE) was an Athenian polemarch (557/6) during the Pisistratid dynasty, and also eromenos of Pisistratus.

He is known for being the father of Hipparchus of the deme Cholargos, archon of 496/5. Hipparchus was the first Athenian to be ostracized in 487 according to a law passed by Kleisthenes especially to banish him. The motive for Kleisthenes' actions was that Hipparchus was the leader and representative of the friends of the tyrants, and was working for the return of his brother-in-law, Hippias, exiled in 511/10, and for the appeasement of the Persians.

Charmus dedicated the statue of Eros in the Academy of Athens, where the runners in the sacred torch race light their torches, and he was the first Athenian to dedicate an altar to that god.

Notes

6th-century BC Athenians
Ancient LGBT people
Eros
Greek LGBT people